Water Way to Go can refer to:
An episode in the 2nd season of Bump in the Night.
An episode in the 2nd season of Happy Tree Friends.